John McGough may refer to:
 John McGough (athlete), Scottish athlete
 John McGough (musician), New Zealand musician and entertainer
 John F. McGough, American football player and coach of football, basketball, and baseball